Jove (from the archaic Latin for father god) usually refers to the god Jupiter (mythology). 

It may also refer to:

 JOVE (Jonathan's Own Version of Emacs), an open-source text editor
 Jove (tribe), a Native American tribe
 Jove, Gijón, Asturias, Spain
 Jove Books, an imprint of Penguin Group
 Jove Francisco, Filipino newscaster
 Journal of Visualized Experiments (JoVE)

See also
 
 JHOVE (JSTOR/Harvard Object Validation Environment), pronounced "jove"
 Giove (disambiguation), the Italian name for Jupiter or Jove